The County of Aubigny is a county (a cadastral division) in Queensland, Australia.  Like all counties in Queensland, it is a non-functional administrative unit, that is used mainly for the purpose of registering land titles.  The county lies between 151°E and 152°E longitude, and it covers the Toowoomba Region and the Dalby part of the Western Downs Region, The county was named by the Surveyor-General of New South Wales in 1850, possibly to honour the Earl of Arundel who had a long association with the name Aubigny. The area was officially named and bounded by the Governor in Council on 7 March 1901 under the Land Act 1897.

Parishes 
Aubigny is divided into parishes, listed as follows:

References

Aubigny